Tindr may refer to:

 Tindr (crater), a crater on Jupiter's moon Callisto
 Tindr Hallkelsson, an Icelandic poet active around the year 1000

See also

 Tinder (disambiguation)